István Nemere (born in Pécs on 8 November 1944) is a Hungarian novelist, Esperantist, and translator. He has written 744 published books by November 2020, mostly in Hungarian, over twenty novels in Esperanto. He has been a notable figure in the world of Hungarian science fiction with as many as 60 novels and several stories.

He has alleged the film, Demolition Man is a ripoff of one of his novels.

Selected works
 The Whip of the Cosmos (A kozmosz korbácsa)
 Steel Shark (Acélcápa) 
 Action Neutron (Neutron-akció)

References

External links
István Nemere website

1944 births
Living people
Hungarian Esperantists
Hungarian librarians
Hungarian translators
Hungarian science fiction writers
People from Pécs